Viganò is an Italian surname. Notable people with the surname include:

Carlo Maria Viganò (born 1941), Italian Roman Catholic prelate, Vatican official
Dario Edoardo Viganò (born 1962), Italian writer and Catholic priest, director of the Vatican Television Center.
Davide Viganò (born 1984), Italian cyclist
Maria Viganò (1769–1821), Austrian ballet dancer, spouse of Salvatore Viganò. 
Paolo Viganò (born 1950), Italian footballer
Salvatore Viganò (1769–1821), Italian choreographer, dancer and composer

Italian-language surnames